Beránek (feminine Beránková) is a Czech surname (meaning "little lamb"). Notable people with that surname include:

 Alois Beranek, Austrian football player, manager and referee
 Bohuslav Beránek (1946−2007), Czech orienteer
 Christian Beranek (born 1974), American graphic novelist and filmmaker
 Espen Beranek Holm (born 1960), Norwegian pop artist and comedian
 Jan Beránek (born 1970), Czech ecological activist and politician
 Jana Beránková, Czech figure skater
 Josef Beránek (born 1969), Czech ice hockey player
 Kateřina Beránková, Czech figure skater
 Leo Beranek (1914−2016), American acoustician
 Miroslav Beránek (born 1957), Czech football coach
 Renata Beránková, Czech rower

Czech-language surnames